Francis Bertrand Jolly (26 January 1865 – 18 February 1943) was a New Zealand farmer and local politician. He was born in London, Ontario, Canada on 26 January 1865.

References

1865 births
1943 deaths
Canadian emigrants to New Zealand
New Zealand farmers
20th-century New Zealand politicians
Politicians from London, Ontario
Hamilton City Councillors